The Jews Relief Act 1858, also called the Jewish Disabilities Bill, is an Act of the Parliament of the United Kingdom which removed previous barriers to Jews entering Parliament, a step in Jewish emancipation in the United Kingdom.

Following the Roman Catholic Relief Act 1829 there had been an unsuccessful attempt in 1830 to also allow Jews to sit in Parliament. The 1858 measure was the result of a long process which began with a bill introduced by the Whig leader Lord John Russell  following the election of Lionel de Rothschild to the City of London constituency in 1847. Rothschild could not take the seat without taking the Christian oath of office. The bill was supported by the future Conservative Prime Minister Benjamin Disraeli but not by his party.

In 1848, the bill was approved by the House of Commons but was twice rejected by the House of Lords as was a new bill in 1851. In the 1852 general election, Rothschild was again elected but the next year the bill was again defeated in the upper house. Finally, in 1858, the House of Lords agreed to a proposal to allow each house to decide its own oath.

The bill allowed "any Person professing the Jewish Religion, [to] omit the Words 'and I make this Declaration upon the true Faith of a Christian in their oaths, but explicitly did not extend to allowing Jews to various high offices, and also stated that "it shall not be lawful for any Person professing the Jewish Religion, directly or indirectly, to advise Her Majesty ... touching or concerning ... any office or preferment in the Church of England or in the Church of Scotland." A separate act passed simultaneously (21 & 22 Vict. c.48) effected similar reforms for the public oaths required other than for Parliament.

Amendments in 1871, 1922, 1973, 1980 and 1986 removed all restrictions on Jews holding office except that they may not advise certain government officials on matters related to appointments in the Church of England or the Church of Scotland.

See also
 Disabilities (Jewish)
 Emancipation of the Jews in the United Kingdom
 Oaths Act 1888, allowing those of no religious belief to simply "solemnly, sincerely, and truly declare"

References
Hansard vol 151 (1858)
Lords: 
14 Jun: Observations;
1 Jul: 2nd Reading;
5 Jul: Committee, Report;
8 Jul: Recommittal;
12 Jul: 3rd Reading;
Commons:
16 Jul: 2nd Reading;
19 Jul: Committee, Report;
20 Jul: 3rd Reading;
Lords:
21 Jul: Agreement.

Citations

Anti-discrimination legislation
Anti-discrimination law in the United Kingdom
United Kingdom Acts of Parliament 1858
Jewish emancipation
1858 in religion
Law about religion in the United Kingdom
Jewish British history